Good-byes and Butterflies is a studio album by Canadian rock band the Five Man Electrical Band. The album includes the band's biggest hit, "Signs," which peaked at #3 on the Billboard Hot 100. The album was released in 1970, and then re-released in 1971 with different cover art. The album reached #52 in the Canadian RPM Magazine charts.

Track listing
All songs written by Les Emmerson.

 "Signs" - 4:05
 "Safe & Sound (With Jesus)" - 3:30
 "Dance of the Swamp Woman" - 3:51
 "(You and I) Butterfly" - 4:52
 "Hello Melinda Goodbye" - 3:15
 "Moonshine (Friend Of Mine)" - 2:10                                             
 "Forever Together" - 2:35
 "Mama's Baby Child" - 3:32
 "The Man with the Horse and Wagon" - 4:45
 "All Is Right (With The World)" - 3:45
 "Variations on a Theme of Lepidoptera" - 2:45

Personnel
 Les Emmerson - guitars, lead vocals (1, 5-8, 10, 11)
 Ted Gerow - organ, piano
 Brian Rading - bass
 Mike Bell - drums, lead vocals (9)
 Rick Bell - percussion, lead vocals (2-4)

References

1970 albums
Five Man Electrical Band albums